Mount Boreas is a prominent peak,  high, between Mount Aeolus and Mount Dido in the Olympus Range of Victoria Land. It was named by the Victoria University of Wellington Antarctic Expedition (1958–59) for Boreas, a figure in Greek mythology.

References
 

Mountains of Victoria Land
McMurdo Dry Valleys